Ifedolapo Opeyemi Badmos popularly known as Dolapo Badmos is a Nigerian Police Officer and a Chief Superintendent of Police who has held different positions in the Nigerian police force She is known for an alleged story where 36  members of the Nigeria police force were demoted on account of misconduct, which was later debunked by the force authority.

Early life and education 
Badmos hails from Ekiti State in Nigeria, she studied Accounting from the Federal Polytechnic, Ado Ekiti, she also owns a master of science degree in Public Administration.

Career 
Badmos joined the Nigeria police force on the 15th, August 2002 as an Assistant Superintendent of police. She has served in various capacity with the Nigerian police force from 2002 till present.
Dolapo Badmos has served as Aide de Camp (ADC) to the number four citizen of Nigeria. She has also served as the divisional traffic officer (DTO) in Alakuko, Lagos, after serving her term she was also promoted to be the Divisional Police Officer (DPO) in charge of Isokoko Division in Agege, Lagos state.
In January, 2016 Dolapo Badmos was named as the new Lagos Police Public Relations officer (PPRO), which she served in the office for few months before she was elevated to zone 2 command covering both Lagos and Ogun state as Police Public Relations officer (PPRO)..
In June 2019, Dolapo Badmos was promoted to become Provost of the Nigeria Police force, the new position availed her the opportunity of changing her head gear, her new position as Provost puts her in charge of disciplining or taking disciplinary actions against eering police officers.

Controversy 
In October 2020, it was alleged that Dolapo Badmos together with 36 members of the Nigeria police force were demoted on account of misconduct. The Police force however dismiss the claims and allegation and stated to the public that Dolapo Badmos was reprimanded and not dismissed or demoted.
She is undoubtedly the most popular female Police officer in Nigeria

Award and recognition 
In 2016, Badmos received the Crime Reporters Association of Nigeria (CRAN) special award, the award was presented to her in recognition of her service to the force.

References 

Living people
Nigerian police officers
1977 births